Orychodes digramma is a species of Brentidae family. It occurs in Papua New Guinea. It was first described in 1835 by Jean Baptiste Boisduval within Arrhenodes. it is currently accepted under the genus Orychodes.

References 

Brentidae
Beetles described in 1835
Insects of Papua New Guinea